¿Dónde está Elisa? may refer to:
 ¿Dónde está Elisa? (Chilean TV series), a 2009 Chilean thriller television soap opera
 ¿Dónde está Elisa? (American TV series), a 2010 Spanish-language telenovela